Agwu may refer to:

Agwu Nsi, an Alusi
Agu, an Igbo word for Leopard

See also
Igbo language
Igbo people